United States Coast Guard Station South Padre Island is a large-sized Search & Rescue United States Coast Guard station home to the Aids to Navigation Team (ANT) South Padre Island, and the cutter USCGC ALLIGATOR  (WPB-87372). It belongs to the United States Coast Guard 8th District, Sector Corpus Christi.

History
The Coast Guard has a long presence on South Padre Island. The original station, named Brazos Santiago, was established in 1881. A lifesaving station was established in 1918 on Boca Chica Beach named Station Brazos. A new location was opened in 1923 on the southern end of South Padre Island to a building that was used for 50 years.

The current station was constructed in 1974, which houses the main office spaces and duty crew berthing. In 1998 the station was named Coast Guard Station South Padre Island reflecting on the island geographic location of the station.

References
http://www.uscg.mil/d8/d8units.asp
 Destination South Padre Island

United States Coast Guard stations
Military facilities in Texas